Sriranga Deva Raya (a.k.a. Sriranga I) (r. 1572–1586 CE) was the eldest son of Tirumala Deva Raya and a king of Vijayanagara empire based at Penukonda. He carried the restoration of the Vijayanagara empire, but his reign was marred with repeated attacks and loss of territories from his Muslim neighbours.

In 1576, the Bijapur Sultan Ali Adil Shah I laid siege to his fort in Penukonda for three months, but at the end Sriranga Deva defeated Adil shah which helped his commanders defeat the Sultan’s army at that time.

Sriranga Deva Raya died in 1586, without an heir and was succeeded by his youngest brother Venkatapathi Raya (Venkata II).

References

Bibliography

Further reading
 
 
 Sathianathaier, R. History of the Nayaks of Madura [microform] by R. Sathyanatha Aiyar ; edited for the University, with introduction and notes by S. Krishnaswami Aiyangar ([Madras] : Oxford University Press, 1924) ; see also ([London] : H. Milford, Oxford university press, 1924) ; xvi, 403 p. ; 21 cm. ; SAMP early 20th-century Indian books project item 10819.
K.A. Nilakanta Sastry, History of South India, From Prehistoric times to fall of Vijayanagar, 1955, OUP, (Reprinted 2002) .

1586 deaths
16th-century Indian monarchs
Vijayanagara Empire
Indian Hindus
Year of birth unknown
People of the Vijayanagara Empire
People from Anantapur district